The Communist Party of British Columbia is the provincial section of the Communist Party of Canada in British Columbia. From the 1945 election to the 1956 election, it was known as the Labour-Progressive Party.

Kimball Cariou, formerly the long-time editor of People's Voice, became the party's leader in December 2020.

Newspapers 
In contrast to other provincial sections of the Communist Party of Canada, the Communist Party of British Columbia published many newspapers of its own for nearly six decades, including the B.C. Worker's News (1935–1937), People's Advocate (1937–1940), Vancouver Clarion (1940–1941), Pacific Advocate (1942–1945), and Pacific Tribune (1946–1992).

Electoral history

References

Citations

Sources

Books

Journal articles 

 

Provincial political parties in British Columbia
British Columbia
1924 establishments in British Columbia
Political parties established in 1924